This is a list of two Brazilian television-related births from 1961.

Events

Debuts

Shows

Births
2 September - Oscar Magrini, actor
19 September - Bia Seidl, actress

Deaths

See also
1961 in Brazil